Pangidigudem is a village in West Godavari, Andhra Pradesh, India. It is located near Dwarakatirumala mandal.

Demographics 

 Census of India, Pangidigudem had a population of 5543. The total population constitute, 2834 males and 2709 females with a sex ratio of 956 females per 1000 males. 571 children are in the age group of 0–6 years, with sex ratio of 976. The average literacy rate stands at 75.44%.

References 

Villages in West Godavari district